The James Nathanial Burwell House, also known as Yellow House Farm, was built about 1842 near Ridgeway, West Virginia. The house is a late example of the Federal Style, with some Greek Revival features, unique in Berkeley County.

The brick house is L-shaped in plan, with a five bay front elevation. A small porch features chamfered columns with a Greek Revival character. The interior is a central hall plan with a room on either side of the stair hall and two rooms in the rear ell.

The house was listed on the National Register of Historic Places in 1991.

References

Federal architecture in West Virginia
Greek Revival houses in West Virginia
Houses completed in 1842
Houses in Berkeley County, West Virginia
Houses on the National Register of Historic Places in West Virginia
National Register of Historic Places in Berkeley County, West Virginia
Burwell family of Virginia